Young Charioteers is a 2015 Hong Kong modern, romance, sports drama produced by TVB, starring Him Law, Sisley Choi, Sammy Sum and Michelle Yim as the main leads. Filmed on location in Hong Kong and Taiwan, the series began airing on March 2, 2015 and is broadcast weekly from Monday to Friday on TVB Jade channel 8:30-9:30 pm timeslot.

Synopsis
Former friends Jedi Yau (Him Law) and Fighting Yip (Sammy Sum) are rivals at work, love and bicycle racing. Jedi and Fighting became friends in high school because of their shared interest in bicycle racing, but lost touch when Fighting had to return to Taiwan for family issues. The two meet again when Fighting becomes Jedi's new colleague at CHUR accounting firm, however Fighting doesn't want to resume his past friendship with Jedi. Their rivalry is further intensified when their work superiors Mucci Lai (Hanjin Tan) and Hillary Ning (Rosina Lam) pit Jedi and Fighting against each other to play office politics. To relieve his stress at work Jedi confides to co-worker Wu Sum Lam (Jinny Ng) who works under his mother Vivian Lee (Michelle Yim), in the Secretary department at the accounting firm. Vivian pushes for Jedi and Sum Lam to become a couple and later the two start dating, but Jedi realizes he doesn't have romantic feelings for Sum Lam. Jedi soon finds himself falling for Moon Yeung (Sisley Choi), the new Accountant at work but decides not to pursue her because she is Fighting's close childhood friend and love interest. After building up their heated rivalry both Jedi and Fighting decide to have a bicycle racing competition to once and for all decide a winner in their rivalry.

Cast

Main cast
Michelle Yim 米 雪 as Vivian Lee Wai Wan 李慧雲
Him Law 羅仲謙 as Jedi Yau Tat 游達
Rosina Lam 林夏薇 as Hillary Ning Hei 寧希
Sammy Sum 沈震軒 as Fighting Yip Fai Ting 葉輝廷
Sisley Choi 蔡思貝 as Moon Yeung Kwong 陽光
Gloria Tang 鄧佩儀 as Tiffany Tam Sin Ngaa 譚倩雅
Alan Wan 溫家偉 as Ted Lee Chi Hung 李志雄

CHUR Accounting firm
Albert Lo 羅浩楷 as Gilbert
Hanjin Tan 陳奐仁 as Mucci Lai Ye Lim 黎義廉
Jinny Ng 吳若希 as Wu Sum Lam 胡芯藍 
Adrian Chau 周志文 as Victor Wong 
William Hu 胡渭康 as Mike 
Hubert Wu 胡鴻鈞 as Dai Ga Ho 戴家豪
Nathan Ngai 魏焌皓 as Lau Lo 劉羅
Zoie Tam 譚凱琪 as Chu Chu 朱珠
Lily Ho 何傲兒 as Tong Ga Ga (Siu Tong) 唐嘉嘉 (少糖)
Russell Cheung 張智軒 as Mike Chim Dak Chi 詹德智
Ip Ting Chi 葉婷芝 as Chan Bo Ling 陳寶玲
Wong Hong Kiu 黃匡翹 as Ho Lok Yee 何樂兒
Nicholas Yuen 阮浩棕 as Sin Dak Yan 冼德仁
Tse Ho Yat 謝可逸 as Gai Siu Heng 繼少恆
Emily Chung 鍾鈺精 as May 
Lucy Li 李旻芳 as Secretary 
Chu Fei Fei 朱斐斐 as Secretary

Extended cast
Poon Chi Man 潘志文 as Yip Hoi Lung 葉海龍
Samantha Chuk 祝文君 as Song Choi Nai 宋彩娜
Vincent Lam 林偉 as Yeung Yat 陽日
Chun Wong 秦煌 as Shum Gai Yu 沈家儒 
Hebe Chan 陳婉婷 as Yau Nei Ya 游妮婭
Kayi Cheung 張嘉兒
Lydia Law 羅欣羚 as Fiona
Niki Chan 陳潁熙 as 
Helen Seng 沈愛琳 as Joanna

Development

 A promo image of Young Charioteers was featured in TVB's 2015 calendar for January.
 The costume fitting ceremony was held on July 15, 2014, 12:30 p.m. at Tseung Kwan O TVB City
 The blessing ceremony was held on August 20, 2014, 3:00 p.m. at Tseung Kwan O TVB City.
 Filming took place from July till October 2014.
 Original overseas filming was supposed to take place in Malaysia but was later changed to Taiwan.
 Taiwan filming took place in September 2014.
Kayi Cheung was originally cast in the role, Song Choi Nai, but was replaced by Samantha Chuk.

Viewership Ratings

Awards and nominations

References

External links
Official Website

TVB dramas
Hong Kong television series
2015 Hong Kong television series debuts
2015 Hong Kong television series endings
2010s Hong Kong television series
Cycling television series